Shehzad Tanweer (15 December 1982 – 7 July 2005) was one of four Islamist terrorists who detonated explosives in three trains on the London Underground and one bus in central London during the 7 July 2005 London bombings. 56 people were killed and over 700 wounded in the attacks.

Tanweer was named by Scotland Yard as the man who detonated a bomb while travelling eastbound on the Circle Line between Liverpool Street and Aldgate, killing both himself and seven of the 56 killed in the attacks. The other three men were identified as Hasib Hussain, Germaine Lindsay, and Mohammad Sidique Khan. All four homegrown terrorists were killed in the explosions.

Biography 

Tanweer was born in St Luke's maternity hospital, Bradford to Parveen Akhtar, whose husband, Mohammed Mumtaz Tanweer, was originally from the Faisalabad region of Pakistan. In 1984, the family moved to the Beeston area of Leeds, then to Colwyn Road (also in Beeston) when Tanweer was seven. Known as Kaka (little one) by his family, he attended Wortley High School, where he was described as politically moderate by his friends, who knew him as an outstanding sportsman, excelling at cricket, triple jump, long-distance running, football, and ju-jitsu.  He then attended Leeds Metropolitan University, where he studied sports science before leaving for Pakistan in 2004 to attend a course in Islamic studies.

At the time of his death, Tanweer is believed to have worked occasionally in his father's fish and chip shop. His father had previously owned a curry takeaway and a butcher's shop and was respected locally as a prominent businessman.

Tanweer attended several mosques including Bengali and Stratford Street mosque in Beeston, where two of the other London bombers, Mohammad Sidique Khan and Hasib Hussain, are also believed to have worshipped. He also frequented the Hamara Youth Access Point, a drop-in centre for teens, alleged to have been used as a recruitment centre by Khan.

Police have confirmed that Khan and Tanweer went on a two-hour rafting trip together on 4 June 2005 at the National Whitewater Centre in Snowdonia National Park in Wales. Forensic evidence found in rucksacks after the abortive 21 July London attacks has linked those attacks to a second group of young men of Asian appearance who booked a rafting trip there on the same day as Tanweer and Khan 

Relatives in Pakistan have said that Tanweer had boasted of wanting to die as a "holy warrior" and that he was enamoured with Osama bin Laden. They noted that incidents such as the Qur'an desecration controversy of 2005 had "always been in his mind".  Tanweer's body was buried at the shrine of a local Islamic saint in Tanweer's ancestral village in Samundari, Pakistan on 27 October 2005.

In 2011, evidence emerged that Tanweer had a 'secret girlfriend' with whom he had been intimately involved for a period of three years beginning in 2002, until shortly before his death.

Trip to Pakistan
After completing the hajj earlier in the year, Tanweer travelled to Pakistan for a course in Islamic studies at a madrasa. The Pakistani government has released footage of Tanweer arriving at Karachi International Airport with Mohammad Sidique Khan, believed to be the ringleader of the London bombers, on Turkish Airlines Flight TK 1056 on 19 November 2004. Tanweer and Khan stayed in Pakistan until 8 February, then flew back to London together. The youngest of the London cell, Hasib Hussain, arrived in Karachi from Riyadh, Saudi Arabia, on 15 July 2004 on Saudi Arabian Airlines Flight SV 714.

Intelligence sources say the school was located in Muridke, Pakistan, 20 miles outside Lahore, named Jamia Manzoorul Islam and is believed to be connected with Lashkar-e-Tayyaba, a banned militant Islamist group. The madrasa has denied any connection with Tanweer.

London bombing

A few days before the bombing, Tanweer rented a red Nissan Micra from a local car-rental agency, and at around the same time, dyed his hair and eyebrows light brown, according to friends; this was due to the strong bleaching effect given off by the bombs' ingredients .

On 7 July, Tanweer, Khan, Hussain, and Lindsay are believed to have picked up the bombs from a house in the Burley area of Leeds, hiding them in large rucksacks, then to have driven to Luton, Bedfordshire in the red Nissan, which he left parked in Luton railway station car park.

In Luton, the men boarded the 07.48 Thameslink train, arriving at King's Cross in London at 08.20 hours, where they went their separate ways and detonated their bombs.

London Underground has confirmed that the three underground bombs exploded within 60 seconds of each other at 8:50 a.m. 

Tanweer travelled eastbound on the Circle line from Kings Cross, detonating his bomb on train number 204 between Liverpool Street and Aldgate stations, also killing at least seven people. He was identified from body parts found in the carriage he blew up.

After the bombings, police found 16 other bombs in Tanweer's car, several of them so-called "initiators" for the rucksack bombs: plastic bottles turned into nail bombs, containing a detonator attached to an electrical cable. Felt-roofing nails were fixed to the outside of the bottles with their tips pointing outwards, apparently intended to cause maximum soft-tissue damage. The devices would then have had cakes of high explosive packed around them.

Video statement 
On 6 July 2006, a video statement by Tanweer was broadcast by Al-Jazeera. In the video, which included remarks by al-Qaeda leader Ayman al-Zawahiri, Tanweer said:

"What have you witnessed now is only the beginning of a string of attacks that will continue and become stronger until you pull your forces out of Afghanistan and Iraq. And until you stop your financial and military support to America and Israel." Tanweer argued that the non-Muslims of Britain deserve such attacks because they voted for a government which "continues to oppress our mothers, children, brothers and sisters in Palestine, Afghanistan, Iraq and Chechnya" 

Tanweer's statement was therefore clearer in making this link with British foreign policy than that of Mohammad Sidique Khan, the presumed lead bomber. The video has also served to solidify speculation that both Khan and Tanweer had contact with Ayman Al-Zawahiri and other senior figures in the Al-Qaeda organisation while in Dubai.

The video also featured a segment by Adam Yahiye Gadahn.

Assets
Tanweer left behind £121,000, but left no will. A spokesman for the probate department at the High Court said: “The net amount figure of £121,000 is the realisable figure which is what is left after taxes and debts on the estate have been deducted."

See also
Mohammad Sidique Khan, Edgware Road underground train
Hasib Hussain, No. 30 Transport for London omnibus
Germaine Lindsay, Piccadilly Line underground train
21 July 2005 London bombings

References

"From cricket-lover who enjoyed a laugh to terror suspect" by Sandra Laville and Ian Cobain, The Guardian, 13 July 2005
"Chemist denies any role in London attacks" by Brian Murphy, The Guardian, 15 July 2005
"Investigators reveal London bomber's links to al-Qaeda" by Gethin Chamberlain, The Scotsman, 16 July 2005
"Warren Street bomb suspect held" by James Sturcke and agencies, The Guardian, 27 July 2005
Images obtained by ABC News
"A life torn apart by terror: one woman's story of survival" by Sandra Laville, The Guardian, 24 September 2005

Further reading 
Profile of Shehzad Tanweer

1982 births
2005 deaths
2005 suicides
English Islamists
Alumni of Leeds Beckett University
English people of Pakistani descent
British people of Punjabi descent
Islamic terrorism in England
Pakistani Islamists
People from Beeston, Leeds
Perpetrators of the July 2005 London bombings
21st-century British criminals
Criminals from Yorkshire
English mass murderers